The Croatian Women's Cup is the national women's football cup competition in Croatia. It is run by the Croatian Football Federation. The competition was established in 1992, following the breakup of Yugoslavia and Croatia's independence. Before 1992 Croatian clubs took part in the Yugoslav Women's Football Cup which had been established in 1974.

Osijek is the most successful team, winning 19 out of 30 seasons. They are followed by Dinamo-Maksimir (6 wins), Split (4 wins) and Zagreb (1 win).

Winners

Key

References

External links
List of cup winners at Rec.Sport.Soccer Statistics Foundation

Football competitions in Croatia
Croatia
Recurring events established in 1992
1992 establishments in Croatia
Cup